The Victoria's Secret Fashion Show is an annual fashion show sponsored by Victoria's Secret, a brand of lingerie and sleepwear. Victoria's Secret uses the show to promote and market its goods in high-profile settings. The show features some of the world's leading fashion models, such as current Victoria's Secret Angels Tyra Banks, Heidi Klum, Gisele Bündchen, and Adriana Lima.
The Victoria's Secret Fashion Show 2002 was recorded in New York, United States at the 69th Regiment Armory. The show featured musical performances by Destiny's Child, Marc Anthony, and Phil Collins. Karolína Kurková was wearing the Victoria's Secret Fantasy Bra : Star of Victoria Fantasy Bra worth $10,000,000.

Fashion show segments

Special Performance

Segment 1: Religious Holiday

Special Performance

Segment 2: Jungle Animals

Special Performance

Segment 3: Flamenco Frills

Segment 4: Neon Angels

Finale 

Angels: Gisele Bündchen, Heidi Klum, Adriana Lima, Tyra Banks, Karolína Kurková.

Returning models: Carmen Kass, Bridget Hall, Naomi Campbell, Fernanda Tavares, Alessandra Ambrosio, Frankie Rayder, Caroline Ribeiro, Oluchi Onweagba.

Newcomers: Yfke Sturm, Eugenia Volodina, Lindsay Frimodt, Michelle Alves, Nadine Strittmatter, Raquel Zimmermann, Liya Kebede, Dewi Driegen, Ana Beatriz Barros, Caitriona Balfe, Inga Savits, Ujjwala Raut, Ana Hickmann, Reka Ebergenyi, Letícia Birkheuer.

Index

External links 

 VSFS 2002 Gallery

Victoria's Secret
2002 in fashion